Haworthia reticulata is a species of succulent plant native to the southwestern Cape Provinces of South Africa.

It can generally be distinguished from similar looking species with pale, green foliage like Haworthia cymbiformis or Haworthia herbacea by the fact that its leaves are flat to convex in shape, though due to the various ecotypes it is often difficult to tell them apart based on leaf morphology alone.

Varieties 

 Haworthia reticulata var. reticulata
 Haworthia reticulata var. attenuata M.B.Bayer
 Haworthia reticulata var. hurlingii (Poelln.) M.B.Bayer
 Haworthia reticulata var. subregularis (Baker) M.B.Bayer

References

External links
 All you wanted to know about Haworthias, Gasterias and Astrolobas: Haworthia reticulata (Blog post)
 

Flora of South Africa
reticulata
Plants described in 1804